Mortaza Behboudi (born April 22 1994) is a Franco-Afghan journalist and documentary filmmaker. In 2019, he was featured in Forbes 30 under 30 in the category of Media and Marketing for his work on Guiti News. Mortaza Behboudi is Bayeux Calvados-Normandy War Correspondents Prize and Prix Varenne winner in the year 2022.   Since January 7, 2023, Behboudi has been detained and imprisoned by the Taliban in Afghanistan, from where he had been reporting for a variety of international media since the Taliban's takeover of Afghanistan in 2021.

Early life and education 
Mortaza Behboudi was born in Afghanistan, in the Wardak province. He is of Hazara ethnicity, a minority that faces genocide in Afghanistan. He became a refugee in 1996 when his parents fled to Iran to escape the newly established Taliban regime. There, at the age of seven, he started working at a local brick factory together with his family, when he was seven years old. Behboudi joined a carpet factory when he was twelve, where he worked at night whilst attending school during the day. 

In 2012, Behboudi came back to Afghanistan to earn his bachelor’s degree in Law and Political Science at Kabul University. In Kabul, he would work as a reporter and cameraman for several journals and TV stations. He also founded the first economic paper in Afghanistan, Daily Bazar, in 2014. Behboudi had to flee the country when  in 2015 he published an investigation on the opium trade and became a target of the Taliban. After being unable to gain asylum in the USA, UK, and Italy, he was accepted by the French. In Paris, he was protected and hosted by The House of Journalists (French: La Maison des Journalistes). During this time, he studied at Pantheon-Sorbonne University to obtain his master's degree in International Relations.

Career 
Since 2012, Behboudi has worked as a journalist in over 35 countries. Mortaza co-founded Guiti News in 2018 and was the director of publication until 2020. The online media platform is the first refugee-led media in France and provides a different perspective on news and migration. For this initiative, Behboudi was selected for Forbes 30 Under 30 2019 in the category of Media and Marketing. He continued his humanitarian work from 2018 as a consulting editor and communication specialist at UNESCO until 2019.   Since 2017, Mortaza Behboudi has been invited to several High Schools around France to promote media education.

In 2020, he was reporting from inside Greece's  largest refugee camp, the refugee camp Moria. From March to August he was confined inside the camp, living with thousands of refugees to report on their daily lives.  In addition to this, he was working on his documentary film, Moria, a Living Hell (French: Moria, par-delà l'enfer) for Arte, which was selected for the Festival de Cinéma de Douarnenez in 2021. 

Since 2021, Behboudi has worked with several news medias on the coverage of Afghanistan. In 2022, Behboudi won the Bayeux Calvados-Normandy War Correspondents Prize in the section of Television Trophy for his report that was done with France 2 called Les petites filles afghanes vendues pour survivre. 

Together with the French journalist Rachida El Azzouzi, he also won the 3rd Prize at Bayeux Calvados-Normandy War Correspondents Awards in the Written Press category, as well as the Varenne Prize in the category of the National Daily Press for their series of reports "A travers l'Afghanistan, sous les Talibans”.  Behboudi is the co-director together with Rachida El Azzouzi of the documentary They will not erase us, the fight of the Afghan women, which was produced in 2022 and broadcast on Mediapart and Arte. 

Since January 7, 2023, Behboudi has been detained and imprisoned by the Taliban in Afghanistan, from where he had been reporting for a variety of international media since the Taliban's takeover of Afghanistan in 2021. A Support Committee working to secure his release was convened on February 9, 2023 by Reporters Without Borders and includes organizations such as Arte, France 24, France Info, La Croix, Libération, Marianne, Mediapart, Radio France, TV5Monde, the Council of Paris, the Human Rights League, Paris 1 Panthéon-Sorbonne University, and the Paris Institute for Critical Thinking.

Awards and recognition 
 2019: Forbes 30 under 30 in the category of Media and Marketing
 2020: Ambassador for One Young World
 2022: Nominee of One Young World - Journalist of the Year Award
 2022: Winner for Bayeux Calvados-Normandy War Correspondents Prize in the section of Television Trophy
 2022: 3rd Place Winner for Bayeux Calvados-Normandy War Correspondents Prize in the section of Print Trophy 
 2022: Prix Varenne in the section of National Daily Press

References 

1994 births
21st-century French journalists
Afghan journalists

Living people
Forbes lists